Voters in  voting in a special election on May 3, 2008, elected Steve Scalise as a new member of the United States House of Representatives, replacing Representative Bobby Jindal who resigned on January 14, 2008, to become Governor of Louisiana.

This election and Louisiana's 6th congressional district special election were the first Louisiana congressional elections not based on Louisiana's jungle primary since the 1970s.

Democratic primary

Candidates
Gilda Reed, psychologist and professor
Vinny Mendoza, United States Air Force veteran, unsuccessful Democratic gubernatorial candidate in 2007

Results

Republican primary

Candidates
Steve Scalise, Louisiana State Senator and former Louisiana State Representative
Tim Burns, Louisiana State Representative
Ben Morris, Mayor of Slidell 
David Simpson, business owner and attorney

Results

Independent candidates
Anthony "Tony G" Gentile, oil refinery supervisor, unsuccessful independent gubernatorial candidate in 2007
R. A. "Skip" Galan

General election

Results

See also
List of special elections to the United States House of Representatives

References

External links
Steve Scalise campaign website
Tim Burns campaign website
Ben Morris campaign website
David Simpson campaign website
Gilda Reed campaign website
Vinny Mendoza campaign website
Tony Gentile campaign website

Louisiana 2008 01
Louisiana 2008 01
2008 01 Special
Louisiana 01 Special
United States House of Representatives 01 Special
United States House of Representatives 2008 01
Louisiana 01